Since 2006, the Lille Comics Festival is the main British and American comic books convention in the north of France, held in November, on the first week end. It occurs in Lille, capital of French Flanders. It is also a gathering of the community of fans, back-issues dealers (drawn from French and Belgian areas) and notable comics creators (signing and drawing sessions). In 2007, for the first time, the Prix Seth Fisher (Seth Fisher Award, named after the artist Seth Fisher) was given to Alan Davis for his achievement in comic books. Attractions include action figures retailers, artwork selling, gaming and drawing lessons for children.

Location and dates

External links
 Portal:Comics
 Official site in English
 MySpace of the festival

Comics conventions